Radan (Serbian Cyrillic: Радан) is a mountain in southern Serbia, near the town of Kuršumlija. Its highest peak, Šopot, has an elevation of 1,408 meters above sea level.

Radan separates the valleys of the Toplica and Jablanica rivers. It is well covered with deciduous and evergreen forests.

The best known spot on Radan is the Devil's Town – a peculiar rock formation consisting of hundreds of mushroom-like posts, located on its southern slopes. Near the Devil's Town there are ruins of Ivanova kula – city of Ivan Kosančić, medieval military commander. Justiniana Prima (Caričin grad), a Byzantine city from the 6th century, is located on the southeast of the mountain, near Lebane.

In summer 2010, Radan attracted media attention because of a "magnetic hill" located on a road near the village of Ivanje. After initial sensationalist articles about "anti-gravity", it soon turned out that it is just an optical illusion. Still, the hill is seen as an opportunity for a tourist attraction.

Nature Park 

In October 2017 the government placed part of the mountain under the protection, as the Nature Park Radan, citing its geological, biological and landscape diversity. Declared the "protected area of exceptional importance" (IUCN Category I), it is divided in three levels of protection, with the highest level occupying  or 2,61% of the total area. Though the best known feature on the mountain, the Devil's Town is not included in the newly formed nature park, though it was previously declared a geo-park on its own.

References

Rhodope mountain range
Mountains of Serbia